Mark Donald Herrmann (born January 8, 1959) is an American former professional football player who was a quarterback in the National Football League (NFL) for twelve seasons during the 1980s and 1990s.  Herrmann played college football for the Purdue Boilermakers, and was recognized as an All-American.  He subsequently played professionally for four different NFL teams.  After retiring as a player, he became the Associate Director of Educational Programs for the NCAA, and currently works as a broadcaster for local football after serving on the Indianapolis Colts broadcast crew for nearly a decade.

Early years
Herrmann was born in Cincinnati and raised in Carmel, Indiana, where he played high school football for Carmel High School.  He also played on Carmel's state championship basketball team in 1977.

College career
Herrmann attended Purdue University, where he played for coach Jim Young's Boilermakers teams from 1977 to 1980.  Herrmann had an impressive college career; in 1980 he was recognized as a consensus first-team All-American, he was selected as the Big Ten Conference's Most Valuable Player, and he finished fourth in voting for the Heisman Trophy.  His 9,946 career passing yards set an NCAA record (which has since been broken).  He is one of only three Purdue quarterbacks to start in three consecutive bowl games (Drew Brees did the same, and Kyle Orton started four straight).  Herrmann won all three of his bowl games, and was selected Most Valuable Player in each of them: the 1978 Peach Bowl, the 1979 Bluebonnet Bowl, and the 1980 Liberty Bowl.  He also holds the Liberty Bowl record for passing touchdowns.

1977: 2,453 yards with 18 TD vs 27 INT in 11 games.
1978: 1,904 yards with 14 TD vs 12 INT in 11 games.
1979: 2,377 yards with 16 TD vs 19 INT in 11 games.
1980: 3,212 yards with 23 TD vs 17 INT in 11 games.  Also won the Sammy Baugh Trophy.

He was elected to the College Football Hall of Fame in May 2010.

Professional career
Herrmann was drafted by the Denver Broncos in 1981, but did not play in his first year out of college. In 1982, he appeared in two games, but at the end of the season he was traded to the Baltimore Colts as part of the deal that brought John Elway to Denver. In 1983–84 Herrmann saw limited action with the Colts, first at Baltimore and then at Indianapolis. In 1985, he was traded to the San Diego Chargers, where he played for three seasons and performed well as the backup to Dan Fouts. Herrmann then played for the Los Angeles Rams in 1988–89, and returned to the Colts for three seasons before retiring in 1992.

Herrmann appeared in just 40 games during his 11-year pro career, completing 334 passes in 561 attempts (59.5%) for a total of 4,015 yards. He threw 16 touchdown passes and was intercepted 36 times.

Personal life
Herrmann lives in Indianapolis with his wife Susie. He has three children.

References

External links
 

1959 births
Living people
American football quarterbacks
Baltimore Colts players
Denver Broncos players
Indianapolis Colts players
Los Angeles Rams players
Purdue Boilermakers football players
San Diego Chargers players
All-American college football players
College Football Hall of Fame inductees
People from Carmel, Indiana
Carmel High School (Indiana) alumni
Players of American football from Cincinnati
Players of American football from Indiana